The John A. Nerud Stakes is a Grade II American Thoroughbred horse race for four years old or older at a distance of seven furlongs on the dirt run annually in early July at Belmont Park in Elmont, New York.  The event currently offers a purse of $250,000.

History

The race was inaugurated on 9 August 2008 as the James Marvin Stakes at Saratoga Race Course over a distance of six furlongs. The event was named after James Marvin, a noted hotel owner and politician in Saratoga Springs in the 19th century. Marvin was one of the first members of the Saratoga Association that founded Saratoga Race Course in 1863. He later became a director of the Association and was its president from 1877 to 1891.

The following year the event was run over a longer distance of seven furlongs. In 2012, the race was classified as a Grade III event. In 2014, the race was moved to Belmont and became part of the Stars and Stripes Festival and was renamed to the Belmont Sprint Championship Stakes.

Clearly Now set a track record at Belmont Park when winning the 2014 renewal in 1:19.96.

In 2017, the race was upgraded to Grade II status by the Thoroughbred Owners and Breeders Association and became part of the Breeders' Cup Challenge "Win and You're In" series – the winner will receive an automatic berth in the Breeders' Cup Sprint.

In 2019 the race was renamed to the John A. Nerud Stakes in honor of the late John Nerud, a prominent thoroughbred owner and trainer who was inducted into the Hall of Fame in 1972.

In 2020 due to the COVID-19 pandemic in the United States, NYRA did not schedule the event in their updated and shortened spring-summer meeting.

Records
Speed record: 
7 furlongs – 1:19.96 Clearly Now (2014)

Margins:
  lengths – Clearly Now (2014)

Most wins by a jockey:
 2 – Cornelio Velásquez: (2009, 2013)
 2 – Joel Rosario: (2012, 2017)

Most wins by a trainer:
 2 – Todd Pletcher: (2021, 2022)

Most wins by an owner:
 No owner has won this event more than once

Winners

See also
 List of American and Canadian Graded races

References 

Graded stakes races in the United States
Grade 2 stakes races in the United States
2008 establishments in New York (state)
Recurring sporting events established in 2008
Horse races in New York (state)
Open sprint category horse races
Belmont Park